Jerry Yan, born Liao Yangzhen, is a Taiwanese actor, model and singer. He is well known for his lead role as Daoming Si in the Taiwanese dramas Meteor Garden and Meteor Garden II, an adaptation of a Japanese shōjō manga. He is also a former member of the boy band group F4 .

Early life
Jerry Yan was born Liao Yangzhen in Taoyuan, Taiwan. He is of Atayal and Hakka descent.

Career
Yan became a model in 2000, after winning the 1998 TVBS Modelling Competition and Men's UNO modelling competition. He began filming advertisements and starring in music videos. In 2000, Jerry began his acting career. His first role is a supporting role in "Spicy Teacher".

With his role as "Daoming Si" in the highly popular Taiwanese drama Meteor Garden and its sequel Meteor Garden II, Jerry shot to fame and became popular across Asia. At the conclusion of the series, Jerry along with the other cast members of Meteor Garden; Vic Chou, Vanness Wu and Ken Chu continued to perform together and released three studio albums as the quartet boy band F4.

In 2002, his television series, Love Scar garnered over 10% ratings.

In 2004, Jerry released his debut solo album, Jerry for You. The album was awarded as one of the "Top 10 Selling Mandarin Albums of the Year" at the IFPI Hong Kong Album Sales Awards, presented by the Hong Kong branch of IFPI. He also won the "Best Album" and "Best Newcomer" (for the Hong Kong/Taiwan region) awards at the China Top Music Awards. The same year, he starred in the Hong Kong romantic comedy Magic Kitchen alongside Andy Lau and Sammi Cheng, marking his film debut.

In 2006, Jerry starred in the critically acclaimed Taiwanese medical drama The Hospital. It was the first Taiwanese series to be imported by Japan's NHK for broadcast.

In 2008, Jerry starred in the sports comedy Hot Shot alongside Wu Chun of Fahrenheit and Show Lo.

In 2009, Jerry starred in Starlit, co-produced by China's China Central Television, Taiwan's Jam Entertainment and Japan's Geneon Entertainment. Broadcasting rights to the show were sold to 15 countries. The series also won "Best Overseas Drama" at the Sky Perfect TV Award. 
The same year, Jerry released his second solo album titled, Freedom.  According to Taiwan's G-Music chart the album is the ninth best selling album in Taiwan in 2009. The Japanese version ranked No. 2 on the daily chart and No. 8 on the weekly chart in Japan's Oricon Chart. He then held a solo concert in Japan; Due to high demand, two additional shows were added. Jerry became the only Taiwanese artist to win "Best International Artist" at the Best Jeanist Awards. He also won "Asia's Most Popular Singer" at the South East Music Chart Awards.

In 2010, Jerry starred in the China-Taiwan co-production Down with Love alongside Ella Chen of S.H.E. Despite having its episodes leaked in Taiwan, it still managed to reach the first-place spot among TV show ratings. He then released his third album, My Secret Lover, which included soundtracks of The Hospital and Hot Shot sung by Jerry. At the Yahoo! Asia Buzz Awards, Jerry was chosen as "Most Popular Taiwan Singer in Korea". He was also named as one of the "Top 10 Singers" in Singapore and Taiwan. He placed 6th on Channel V's Fresh Asia Charts, being the highest ranking for Taiwanese singers.

In 2011, Jerry starred in My Splendid Life, a remake of the 2009 Korean hit drama Brilliant Legacy. The series reached 100 million views on Youku, and topped the ratings charts for numerous weeks. The same year, he won Best Asian Star at the Asia Model Awards held in Seoul.

In 2012, Jerry starred in Taiwan's costume film Ripples of Desire, directed by Zero Chou.

In 2014, Jerry starred in the romance melodrama Loving, Never Forgetting opposite Chinese actress Tong Liya, playing a single father. The same year, he starred in the Japanese heist film Lupin III: Necklace of Cleopatra based on the manga of the same name alongside Shun Oguri, the lead actor of the Japanese version of Meteor Garden, and Kim Joon, one of the lead actors of the Korean version of Meteor Garden.

In 2015, Jerry made a special appearance in the highly popular youth movie Our Times as the adult version of the male protagonist, Xu Taiyu. He then starred in the Chinese television series My Best Ex-Boyfriend.

In 2019, Jerry was cast in the romance film Matchmaking Battle.

In 2020, Jerry is starring in the romantic comedy drama Count Your Lucky Stars alongside Shen Yue.

In 2021, he joined the cast of Call Me By Fire as a contestant.

Personal life
Jerry was in an on and off relationship with model Lin Chi-ling for many years. Jerry admitted to reuniting with Lin on 2017-11-10. This was neither confirmed nor denied by Lin. 
Around one year later, however, Jerry refused to comment and Lin denied dating.

Filmography

Television series

Film

Discography

Studio albums

F4 albums

Meteor Rain (2001)
Fantasy 4ever (2002)
Waiting for you (2007)

Bibliography

9314 Man and Boy (Publisher: Yuan Shen Chu Ban She)

Awards

References

External links
 Official website (Japan)
 Jerry Yan's Mini-blog

1977 births
Living people
F4 (band) members
Taiwanese male television actors
Male actors from Taoyuan City
Taiwanese people of Hakka descent
Hakka musicians
Taiwanese idols
21st-century Taiwanese male singers
Musicians from Taoyuan City
Atayal people